The 1990 Anchorage mayoral election was held on October 2 and October 30, 1990, to elect the mayor of Anchorage, Alaska. It saw reelection of Tom Fink.

Since at no candidate received 40% of the vote in the first round (which at least one candidate was required to obtain to avoid a runoff), a runoff was held between the top-two finishers of the first round.

Candidates
H. A. "Red" Boucher, former Lieutenant Governor of Alaska, former member of the Alaska House of Representatives, and former mayor of Fairbanks, Alaska
Tom Fink, incumbent mayor
Rick Mystrom, advertising executive

Results

First round

Runoff

References

Anchorage
Anchorage 
1990